Multicentric carpotarsal osteolysis syndrome (MCTO) is a rare autosomal dominant condition. This condition is also known as idiopathic multicentric osteolysis with nephropathy. It is characterised by carpal-tarsal destruction and kidney failure.

Signs and symptoms

The presentation is of gradual loss of the small bones in the carpus and tarsus. This may lead to joint subluxation and instability. The kidney failure, when present, usually presents as the presence of protein in the urine.

In some cases, there may also be craniofacial abnormalities including
 Triangular facies
 Micrognathia
 Maxillary hypoplasia
 Exophthalmos

Histology of renal biopsies show glomerulosclerosis and severe tubulointerstitial fibrosis.

Intellectual disability may occur.

Genetics

This condition is caused by mutations in the transcription factor MafB, or V-maf musculoaponeurotic fibrosarcoma oncogene homolog B (MAFB), gene. This gene encodes a basic leucine zipper (bZIP) transcription factor.

The gene is located on the long arm of chromosome 20 (20q11.2-q13.1).

Pathogenesis

How this mutation causes the clinical picture is not currently clear.

Diagnosis

The diagnosis may be suspected on the basis of the constellation of clinical features. It is made by sequencing the MAFB gene.

Classification

This condition has been classified into five types.
 Type 1: hereditary multicentric osteolysis with dominant transmission
 Type 2: hereditary multicentric osteolysis with recessive transmission
 Type 3: nonhereditary multicentric osteolysis with nephropathy
 Type 4: Gorham–Stout syndrome

Differential diagnosis
The condition should be differentially diagnosed from juvenile rheumatoid arthritis and other genetic skeletal dysplasias as  Multicentric Osteolysis, Nodulosis, and Arthropathy.

Treatment

Optimal treatment for this condition is unclear. Bisphosphonates and denosumab may be of use for the bone lesions. Cyclosporine A may be of use for treating the nephropathy. Steroids and other immunosuppressant drugs do not seem to be of help.

History

This condition was first described by Shurtleff et al. in 1964.

References 

Genetic diseases and disorders
Rare diseases